Private University of Santa Cruz de la Sierra (Universidad Privada de Santa Cruz de la Sierra) is a private University in Bolivia.

Alumni include Brenda Boral, Luis Fernando Camacho and Liliana Colanzi.

Faculty include Raquel Couzet.

The school hosts the UPSA Cup.

References

External links
University website

Universities in Bolivia